Hornow-Wadelsdorf is a former municipality in the district of Spree-Neiße, in Brandenburg, Germany. On 1 January 2016 it was dissolved, and Hornow and Wadelsdorf became part of the town Spremberg.

References

Populated places in Spree-Neiße
Former municipalities in Brandenburg